Pasanen is a Finnish surname. Notable people with the surname include:

 Aukusti Pasanen (1902–1986), Finnish politician
 Spede Pasanen (1930-2001), Finnish film director and producer, comedian, humorist, inventor and TV personality
 Veijo Pasanen (1930-1988), Finnish actor, cousin of Spede Pasanen
 Jari Pasanen (born 1964), Finnish-German professional ice hockey coach
 Petri Pasanen (born 1980), Finnish former footballer

Finnish-language surnames